Anastasia Nichita (born 19 February 1999) is a Moldovan freestyle wrestler. She won the gold medal in the 59kg event at the 2022 World Wrestling Championships held in Belgrade, Serbia. She is a two-time gold medalist in the 59 kg event at the European Wrestling Championships. She also represented Moldova at the 2020 Summer Olympics in Tokyo, Japan.

Career 

At the 2018 European U23 Wrestling Championship in Istanbul, Turkey, she won the silver medal in the women's 59 kg event. At the 2019 World U23 Wrestling Championship in Budapest, Hungary, she also won the silver medal in the women's 59 kg event. In the final, she lost against Yumeka Tanabe of Japan.

In 2019, at the European Wrestling Championships held in Bucharest, Romania, she won one of the bronze medals in the women's 57 kg event. In that same year, she also won a bronze medal in the women's 57 kg event at the 2019 European Games held in Minsk, Belarus. In her bronze medal match she defeated Grace Bullen of Norway. In 2020, she won the gold medal in the women's 59 kg event at the European Wrestling Championships held in Rome, Italy. She defeated Bilyana Dudova of Bulgaria in the final. She also won the gold medal in the women's 57 kg event at the Individual Wrestling World Cup held in Belgrade, Serbia.

In 2021, she won one of the bronze medals in the 59 kg event at the European Wrestling Championships held in Warsaw, Poland. She won the gold medal in her event at the 2021 European U23 Wrestling Championship held in Skopje, North Macedonia.

She represented Moldova at the 2020 Summer Olympics in Tokyo, Japan. She competed in the women's 57 kg event where she won her first match against Odunayo Adekuoroye of Nigeria and she was then eliminated in her next match by eventual bronze medalist Evelina Nikolova of Bulgaria. At the 2021 U23 World Wrestling Championships held in Belgrade, Serbia, she competed in the women's 59 kg event.

In February 2022, she won the gold medal in the women's 59 kg event at the Yasar Dogu Tournament held in Istanbul, Turkey. In March 2022, she won the gold medal in the women's 59 kg event at the European U23 Wrestling Championship held in Plovdiv, Bulgaria. In that same month, she also won the gold medal in the 59 kg event at the European Wrestling Championships held in Budapest, Hungary. In the final, she defeated Jowita Wrzesień of Poland.

She won the gold medal in the 59kg event at the 2022 World Wrestling Championships held in Belgrade, Serbia. She defeated Grace Bullen of Norway in her gold medal match.

She won the gold medal in the women's 59kg event at the 2023 Grand Prix Zagreb Open held in Zagreb, Croatia. She won the silver medal in her event at the 2023 Ibrahim Moustafa Tournament held in Alexandria, Egypt.

Achievements

References

External links 

 

Living people
1999 births
Place of birth missing (living people)
Moldovan female sport wrestlers
World Wrestling Championships medalists
European Wrestling Championships medalists
Wrestlers at the 2019 European Games
European Games bronze medalists for Moldova
European Games medalists in wrestling
Wrestlers at the 2020 Summer Olympics
Olympic wrestlers of Moldova
European Wrestling Champions
21st-century Moldovan women